

Medallists

Men's Competition

Individual Foil

Individual Epée

Women's competition

Individual Foil

Individual Epée

Medal table

References
Complete 2001 Mediterranean Games Standings

M
Sports at the 2001 Mediterranean Games
 
Fencing competitions in Tunisia